Muhlis Tayfur (1922–21 July 2008) was a Turkish sport wrestler, born in Erzurum. He won a silver medal in Greco-Roman wrestling, middleweight class, at the 1948 Summer Olympics in London.

References

External links

1922 births
2008 deaths
Sportspeople from Erzurum
Wrestlers at the 1948 Summer Olympics
Turkish male sport wrestlers
Olympic wrestlers of Turkey
Olympic silver medalists for Turkey
Olympic medalists in wrestling
Medalists at the 1948 Summer Olympics
20th-century Turkish people
21st-century Turkish people